Urgorria is a genus of cavibelonian solenogasters, shell-less, worm-like,  marine  mollusks.

Species
 Urgorria compostelana García-Alvarez & Salvini-Plawen, 2001
 Urgorria monoplicata Salvini-Plawen, 2003

References

 García-Alvarez O. & Salvini-Plawen L. v. (2001). Urgorria compostelana gen. et sp. nov. (Mollusca, Solenogastres, Rhopalomeniidae), a new species from off Galicia, Northwest of Spain. Sarsia 86(3): 183-189
 García-Álvarez O., Salvini-Plawen L.v., Urgorri V. & Troncoso J.S. (2014). Mollusca. Solenogastres, Caudofoveata, Monoplacophora. Fauna Iberica. 38: 1-294.

Solenogastres